The 2022 Jack's Dutch Darts Championship was the eighth of thirteen PDC European Tour events on the 2022 PDC Pro Tour. The tournament took place at the IJsselhallen, Zwolle, Netherlands, from 27–29 May 2022. It features a field of 48 players and £140,000 in prize money, with £25,000 going to the winner.

Ian White was the defending champion after defeating Ricky Evans 8–5 in the 2018 final, but he failed to qualify for the tournament.

Michael Smith won the tournament, his fifth European Tour title and first since 2017, with an 8–7 win over Danny Noppert.

Prize money
The prize money was unchanged from the European Tours of the last 3 years:

 Seeded players who lose in the second round and host nation qualifiers (who qualify automatically as a result of their ranking) who lose in their first match of the event shall not be credited with prize money on any Order of Merit. A player who qualifies as a qualifier, but later becomes a seed due to the withdrawal of one or more other players shall be credited with their prize money on all Orders of Merit regardless of how far they progress in the event.

Qualification and format
The top 16 entrants from the PDC ProTour Order of Merit on 30 April automatically qualified for the event and were seeded in the second round.

The remaining 32 places went to players from six qualifying events – 24 from the Tour Card Holder Qualifier (held on 9 May), two from the Associate Member Qualifier (held on 24 April), the two highest ProTour ranking Dutch players, two from the Host Nation Qualifier (held on 26 May), one from the Nordic & Baltic Associate Member Qualifier (held on 20 February), and one from the East European Associate Member Qualifier (held on 24 April).

Luke Humphries was due to participate as the fifth seed but withdrew due to a personal commitment. As a result, Chris Dobey became a seed and an additional place was made available at the Host Nation Qualifier.

Jim Williams withdrew on the morning of the first day, as he missed his flight to the Netherlands, so Ritchie Edhouse received a bye into the second round.

The following players took part in the tournament:

Top 16
  (second round)
  (third round)
  (third round)
  (third round)
  (second round)
  (second round)
  (second round)
  (third round)
  (champion)
  (second round)
  (second round)
  (quarter-finals)
  (second round)
  (second round)
  (second round)
  (third round)

Tour Card Qualifier
  (third round)
  (quarter-finals)
  (third round)
  (quarter-finals)
  (first round)
  (second round)
  (second round)
  (first round)
  (first round)
  (semi-finals)
  (quarter-finals)
  (first round)
  (first round)
  (withdrew)
  (second round)
  (second round)
  (second round)
  (first round)
  (second round)
  (first round)
  (semi-finals)
  (first round)
  (first round)

Associate Member Qualifier
  (first round)
  (first round)

Highest Ranked Dutchmen
  (runner-up)
  (first round)

Host Nation Qualifier
  (first round)
  (second round)
  (first round)

Nordic & Baltic Qualifier
  (third round)

East European Qualifier
  (first round)

Draw

Notes

References

2022 PDC Pro Tour
2022 PDC European Tour
2022 in Dutch sport
May 2022 sports events in the Netherlands